John Donato Torrio (born Donato Torrio, ; January 20, 1882 – April 16, 1957) was an Italian born-American mobster who helped build the Chicago Outfit in the 1920s later inherited by his protégé Al Capone. Torrio proposed a National Crime Syndicate in the 1930s and later became an adviser to Lucky Luciano and his Luciano crime family.

Torrio had several nicknames, primarily "The Fox" for his cunning and finesse. The US Treasury official Elmer Irey considered him "the biggest gangster in America" and wrote, "He was the smartest and, I dare say, the best of all the hoodlums. 'Best' referring to talent, not morals". Virgil W. Peterson of the Chicago Crime Commission stated that his "talents as an organizational genius were widely respected by the major gang bosses in the New York City area". Crime journalist Herbert Asbury affirmed: "As an organizer and administrator of underworld affairs, Johnny Torrio is unsurpassed in the annals of American crime; he was probably the nearest thing to a real mastermind that this country has yet produced".

Early life
Torrio was born in Irsina (then known as Montepeloso), Basilicata, in Southern Italy, to Tommaso Torrio and Maria Carluccio originally from Altamura, Apulia. When he was two his father, a railway employee, died in a work accident; shortly after, Torrio immigrated to James Street on the Lower East Side of New York City with his widowed mother in December 1884. She later remarried.

His first jobs were as a porter and bouncer in Manhattan. While he was a teenager, he joined a street gang together with another James Street resident Robert Vanella and became its leader; he eventually managed to save enough money and opened a billiards parlor for the group, and from there grew illegal activities such as gambling and loan sharking. Torrio's business sense caught the eye of Paul Kelly, the leader of the Five Points Gang. Torrio's gang ran legitimate businesses, but its main concern was the numbers game, supplemented by incomes from bookmaking, loan sharking, hijacking, prostitution, and opium trafficking. Al Capone, who worked at Kelly's club, admired Torrio's quick mind and looked to him as his mentor.

Capone had belonged to the Junior Forty Thieves, the Bowery Boys and the Brooklyn Rippers; they soon moved up to the Five Points Gang. Torrio eventually hired Capone to bartend at the Harvard Inn, a bar in the Coney Island section of Brooklyn owned by Torrio's business associate, Frankie Yale.

Move to Chicago

Torrio was the nephew of Victoria Moresco, the wife and business partner of "Big Jim" Colosimo, who had become the owner of more than 100 brothels in Chicago. According to Laurence Bergreen, "Torrio is [also] described as Colosimo’s nephew, but in the absence of any evidence to confirm the relationship, it is more likely their kinship was spiritual rather than familial".

In 1909, Colosimo invited Torrio to Chicago to deal with extortion demands from the Black Hand. Torrio eliminated the extortionists and stayed on; he ran Colosimo's operations and organized the criminal muscle needed to deal with threats to them.
	
In 1919, Al Capone arrived in Chicago and started working as a bouncer and bartender at one of the Colosimo gang establishments, the Four Deuces at 2222 S. Wabash Street.

Colosimo murder
When Prohibition went into effect in 1920, Torrio pushed for the gang to enter into bootlegging, but Colosimo stubbornly refused. In March 1920, Colosimo secured an uncontested divorce from Moresco. A month later, he and Dale Winter eloped to West Baden Springs, Indiana. Upon their return, he bought a home on the South Side. On May 11, 1920, Torrio called and told Colosimo that a shipment was about to arrive at his restaurant. Colosimo drove there to await it, but instead, he was shot in an ambush and killed. Frankie Yale had allegedly traveled from New York to Chicago and personally killed longtime gang boss Colosimo at the behest of Chicago Outfit friends Torrio and Capone. Although suspected by Chicago police, Yale was never officially charged. Colosimo was allegedly murdered because he stood in the way of his gang making bootlegging profits, having "gone soft" as a result of his marriage to Winter. Al Capone has also been suggested as the gunman. Colosimo's ex-wife, unhappy with the financial arrangements of the divorce, is also theorized to have arranged the murder.

Rivalry with North Side Gang
Torrio headed an essentially Italian organized crime group that was the biggest in the city, with Capone as his right-hand man. He was wary of being drawn into gang wars and tried to negotiate agreements over territory between rival crime groups. In 1920, Torrio was able to forge together an agreement between most of Chicago's bootlegging gangs into a city-wide cartel.  The smaller North Side Gang led by Dean O'Banion was of mixed ethnicity, and was a member of the bootlegging cartel. In 1924, the North Side gang found out that the Genna brothers, who were close to Torrio's gang, were selling their booze in North Side gang territory. O'Banion went to Torrio who was unhelpful with the encroachment of the Gennas into the North Side, despite his pretensions to be a settler of disputes. As a result, the North Side gang responded by hijacking Genna beer shipments. 

In May, 1924, O'Banion learned that the police were planning to raid the Sieben brewery on a particular night. Before the raid, O'Banion approached Torrio and told him he wanted to sell his share in the brewery, claiming that he wanted to leave the rackets and retire to Colorado. Torrio agreed to buy O'Banion's share and gave him half a million dollars. On the morning of the deal, the police (including the police chief), raided and shut down the brewery. Torrio, O'Banion, and several others were arrested. Torrio was indicted on bootlegging charges, a repeat offense for him with mandatory jail time. Torrio realized he had been betrayed and conned out of $500,000 by O’Banion. 

Torrio would have immediately attempted to retaliate against O’Banion and the North Side gang had it not been for Mike Merlo, head of the Unione Siciliana labor organization. Merlo had a vested interest in keeping the peace between Chicago’s gangs, and he convinced Torrio to forestall any violence against the North Side Gang.  

Mike Merlo died of cancer on November 08, 1924. On November 10th, three men entered O’Banion’s Schofield's Flowers shop, under the pretense of buying flowers for Merlo’s funeral, and shot O’Banion dead. The killers are reputed to have been Frankie Yale, John Scalise, and Albert Anselmi, acting on Torrio’s behalf. 

O’Banion’s death placed Hymie Weiss at the head of the North Side gang, backed by Vincent Drucci and Bugs Moran. Weiss had been a close friend of O'Banion, and the North Siders made it a priority to get revenge on his killers.

Assassination attempt and handover to Capone
In January 1925, Capone was ambushed, leaving him shaken but unhurt. Twelve days later, on January 24, Torrio and his wife Anna were ambushed outside their home by Weiss, Drucci, and Moran. Torrio was shot several times and nearly killed. After recovering, he effectively resigned, handed control of the gang to Capone, and fled to New York.

In late 1925, Torrio moved to Italy with his wife and mother, where he no longer dealt directly in mob business. He gave total control of the Outfit to Capone and said, "It's all yours, Al. Me? I'm quitting. It's Europe for me". Torrio left a criminal empire which grossed about $70,000,000 a year ($1,169,184,000 in 2022 dollars) from bootleg liquor, gambling and prostitution.

Later years and death

In 1928, Torrio returned to the United States, as Benito Mussolini began putting pressure on the Mafia in Italy. He is credited with helping to organize a loose cartel of East Coast bootleggers, the Big Seven, in which a number of prominent gangsters, including Lucky Luciano, Longy Zwillman, Joe Adonis, Frank Costello, and Meyer Lansky played a part. Torrio also supported the creation of a national body that would prevent the sort of all-out turf wars between gangs that had broken out in Chicago and New York. His idea was well received, and a conference was hosted in Atlantic City by Torrio, Lansky, Luciano and Costello in May 1929; the National Crime Syndicate was created.

Torrio was charged with income tax evasion in 1936, and after several failed appeals, was sent to prison in 1939, serving two years. In 1940, property that Torrio co-owned with Vanella, Jack Cusick and Capone was sold at auction to satisfy Capone's tax delinquencies. After his release, he lived quietly until his death.

On April 16, 1957, Torrio had a heart attack in the Brooklyn borough of New York City, New York while he was sitting in a barber's chair waiting for a haircut; he died several hours later in a nearby hospital.

In popular culture
Torrio has been portrayed several times in television and motion pictures:

 by Osgood Perkins in the 1932 film, Scarface (as Johnny Lovo).
 by Nehemiah Persoff in the 1959 film, Al Capone.
 by Charles McGraw in the 1959 television series of The Untouchables.
 by Harry Guardino in the 1975 film, Capone.
 by Guy Barile in the 1992 film, The Babe.
 by Frank Vincent in the 1993 The Young Indiana Jones Chronicles episode "Young Indiana Jones and the Mystery of the Blues".
 by Byrne Piven in the pilot episode of the 1993 television series, The Untouchables.
 by Kieron Jecchinis in a 1994 episode of the television series, In Suspicious Circumstances entitled "No Witness, No Case".
 by Greg Antonacci in the HBO series, Boardwalk Empire.
 by Paolo Rotondo in the 2016 television miniseries The Making of the Mob: Chicago.
 by Al Sapienza in the 2017 film Gangster Land.

References

Further reading

External links
 
 

1882 births
1957 deaths
American gangsters of Italian descent
Al Capone associates
American crime bosses
American shooting survivors
Burials at Green-Wood Cemetery
Chicago Outfit bosses
Chicago Outfit mobsters
Criminals from Chicago
Five Points Gang
Italian emigrants to the United States
Italian crime bosses
Italian gangsters
Gangsters from Chicago
People from Chicago
People from Irsina
Prohibition-era gangsters